Clifty Fork is a stream in Pike County in the U.S. state of Missouri. It is a tributary of South Spencer Creek.

Clifty Fork was named on account of its steep banks.

See also
List of rivers of Missouri

References

Rivers of Pike County, Missouri
Rivers of Missouri